Ronald Francis Shaw (19209 August 1945) was a Royal Air Force corporal who was captured by the Japanese during World War II, and was killed by the atomic bombing of Nagasaki while in Japanese captivity.

Shaw was from Edmonton, London, and served as an engine fitter in the Royal Air Force. He initially served in Egypt before being transferred to the Far East. His plane was shot down by Japanese forces near the island of Java, and he was captured in 1942 and taken to Japan as a prisoner of war. On 9 August 1945, the US atomic bombing of Nagasaki took place, and the bomb is believed to have exploded close to the area where Shaw was being held prisoner. He was killed when a wall fell on him.

Shaw was the first prisoner of war to be listed at the Nagasaki National Peace Memorial Hall for the Atomic Bomb Victims and the second non-Japanese (the first being a Chinese civilian).

References

1920 births
1945 deaths
Royal Air Force airmen
Royal Air Force personnel killed in World War II
World War II prisoners of war held by Japan
British World War II prisoners of war
Military personnel from London
People from Edmonton, London